The 1987 Coca-Cola 600, the 28th running of the event, was a NASCAR Winston Cup Series race held on May 24, 1987 at Charlotte Motor Speedway in Charlotte, North Carolina. Contested over 400 laps on the 1.5 mile (2.4 km) speedway, it was the 10th race of the 1987 NASCAR Winston Cup Series season. Kyle Petty of Wood Brothers Racing won the race.

Allan Grice made his NASCAR Winston Cup Series debut in this event.

Background
Charlotte Motor Speedway is a motorsports complex located in Concord, North Carolina, United States 13 miles from Charlotte, North Carolina. The complex features a 1.5 miles (2.4 km) quad oval track that hosts NASCAR racing including the prestigious Coca-Cola 600 on Memorial Day weekend and The Winston, as well as the Oakwood Homes 500. The speedway was built in 1959 by Bruton Smith and is considered the home track for NASCAR with many race teams located in the Charlotte area. The track is owned and operated by Speedway Motorsports Inc. (SMI).

Top 10 results

Race statistics
 Time of race: 4:33:48
 Average Speed: 
 Pole Speed: 
 Cautions: 12 for 68 laps
 Margin of Victory: 1 lap
 Lead changes: 23
 Percent of race run under caution: 17%         
 Average green flag run: 25.5 laps

References

Coca-Cola 600
Coca-Cola 600
NASCAR races at Charlotte Motor Speedway